Rehab Bassam, is an Egyptian blogger who rose to fame in 2008 when Dar al Shorouk, one of the most prominent Egyptian publishing houses, published a collection of her blog posts in book form. She is an active blogger since November 2004.

Biography 
A graduate of Faculty of Arts (Kolleyyat al Aadaab) with a major in English, Rehab started to blog back in 2004, taking it "as a challenge", in her own words, when a friend of hers teased her online for not having a blog. Having a look at his, she realized that a blog is where an individual writes about his or her daily routine, and she said to herself "It's no big deal, I too can do that". That very day she created a blog.

As an Anglophone, Bassam's early posts were in English, but simultaneously and "overnight", she found herself writing in Arabic by September 2004.

Bassam had a career in market research, copywriting, editing, and translation and publishing of children books.

Blog
In 2004, Bassam came into the Egyptian blogosphere, a then nascent community, through her blog Hawadeet (Egyptian colloquialism for "tales"), writing under the nickname Hadouta (Egyptian colloquialism for "a tale"), which soon gained a growing popularity. Her blog writing, stories as well as diary, is described by local reviewers as "gripping, funny, full of echoes from a wide range of influences", "spontaneous", exhibiting "high literary powers", written "in a fine style", "well-written", "expressive", and "marvelous".

Works

References 

 Rehab Bassam, Orz bel Laban le Shakhsain (2008),

External links 
 Hawadeet Rehab Bassam's blog
 Yallabina "Pink-clad Writer-Blogger Shares her Recipe" A book discussion listing
 Masrawy "Three Egyptian Blogs are Bestsellers in CIBF"
 Daily Star Egypt "Female bloggers invade Egypt’s literary scene"
 Boss wu Toll "Blog Girls Sign their Books"
  "Rice Pudding for Two", Al Ahram Ahmad Bahgat's column
 The book profile page on the publisher's website
 Global Voices Online, From Blogs to Books
 YouTube An interview with Rehab Bassam and fellow bloggers on Dream TV Channel's Al 'Ashera Masa'an (Ten PM) program, 1 of 3
 YouTube An interview with Rehab Bassam and fellow bloggers on Dream TV Channel's Al 'Ashera Masa'an (Ten PM) program, 2 of 3
 YouTube An interview with Rehab Bassam and fellow bloggers on Dream TV Channel's Al 'Ashera Masa'an (Ten PM) program, 3 of 3
 Short biography from the Berlin International Literature Festival

1977 births
Egyptian women writers
Egyptian bloggers
Living people
Egyptian women bloggers